The NIIDAR company, the Scientific and Research Institute for Long-Distance Radio Communications is a Russian manufacturer of radar systems.

History
It was established in 1916 as an automobile repairs workshop, to repair vehicles damaged during World War I. After 1939 it became known as the "Plant No. 37 named after Sergo Ordzhonikidze". In the 1930s and 1940s, the plant built a number of light tanks, including the T-37A, T-38, T-40, T-60. It developed a number of radars from 1949 to 1959 in co-operation with the NII-20 Lianozovo Electromechanical Plant.

Products
Unlike the NNIIRT, this design bureau focused on higher frequency radars like the P-20, P-30, P-30M, P-35, P-32D2 and the P-50 (NATO: E/F-bands). These radars have better accuracy and faster scan rates, and are thus more suited for ground control of fighter aircraft, which complement the lower frequency radars developed by the NNIIRT design bureau.

NNIDAR has in recent years expanded their product range to include innovative radar designs like the Podsolnukh-E over-the-horizon (OTH) surface-wave radar and the 29B6 Konteyner. The latter, while also being an OTH-radar, has separate locations for the transmitter and the receiver making it a bi-static system.

NIIDAR designed air surveillance radars

References

External links
 Official website

Defence companies of Russia
Manufacturing companies based in Moscow
RTI Systems
Electronics companies of the Soviet Union
Defence companies of the Soviet Union
Research institutes in the Soviet Union